Howard Kent Birnbaum (18 October 1932 Brooklyn, New York – 23 January 2005 Urbana, Illinois) was an American metallurgist who was well known due to his works on the interaction of point, linear and planar defects in plastic deformation of materials.

He received his BS in 1953 and MS in 1955 from Columbia University. In 1958 he received his PhD in metallurgy from University of Illinois at Urbana–Champaign. In 1958 he started teaching at the University of Chicago and joined University of Illinois in 1961.

Awards
Guggenheim Fellowship - 1967
Robert Franklin Mehl Gold Medal - The Metallurgical Society, American Institute of Mining, Metallurgical and Petroleum Engineers - 1986
Von Hippel Award - Materials Research Society - 2002

Footnotes

References
Karl A. Gschneider Jr., Howard K. Birnbaum, Acta Materialia, Vol. 53 (2005), pp. 2545–2546 

1932 births
2005 deaths
Scientists from New York (state)
American metallurgists
Columbia School of Engineering and Applied Science alumni
University of Illinois Urbana-Champaign alumni
People from Brooklyn
University of Chicago faculty
University of Illinois Urbana-Champaign faculty
Fellows of the American Physical Society
Fellows of the Minerals, Metals & Materials Society